Long Live the Island Frogs is a 1972 South Korean drama film directed by Jung Jin-woo. It was entered into the 23rd Berlin International Film Festival.

Cast
 Joo Sun-tae
 Shin Il-ryong

References

External links

1972 films
1970s Korean-language films
1972 drama films
Films directed by Jung Jin-woo
South Korean drama films